Statistics of Nemzeti Bajnokság I for the 1913–14 season.

Overview
It was contested by 10 teams, and MTK Hungária FC won the championship.

League standings

Results

References
Hungary - List of final tables (RSSSF)

1913-14
1913–14 in Hungarian football
1913–14 in European association football leagues